Thomas William Caldecott (October 21, 1914 – May 6, 1994) was an American judge and Republican Party politician in California.

Born in Berkeley, California, Caldecott was the son of Eveline Grooms Caldecott and Thomas Edwin Caldecott, who went on to serve on the City Council, as Mayor, and on the Alameda County Board of Supervisors before becoming the namesake of the Caldecott Tunnel.  The younger Caldecott attended public schools in Berkeley and went on to the University of California, Berkeley, where he earned his Bachelor of Arts and Juris Doctor.  After law school, he worked for Attorney General Earl Warren and then served in the United States Army during World War II.

In 1946, Caldecott was elected to the California State Assembly.  In 1949, he became Chairman of the Assembly Civil Service and State Personnel Committee.  He became Chairman of the Assembly Judiciary Committee in 1953 and then the Assembly Ways and Means Committee later that same year.  While still serving in the Assembly, Caldecott also served as Chairman of the California Republican Party from 1954 to 1956.  He resigned from the State Assembly in 1957 when Governor Goodwin Knight appointed him a Judge of the Alameda County Superior Court.

He left the Superior Court in 1968 to become Chief Legislative Secretary to Governor Ronald Reagan.  In 1969, Reagan appointed Caldecott as an associate justice of the California First District Court of Appeal, Division Three, where he eventually became Presiding Justice.  In 1975, Chief Justice Donald Wright appointed Caldecott to the Judicial Council of California where he served until 1979 as a representative of the courts.  He retired from the Court of Appeal in 1984.

Caldecott died of cancer on May 6, 1994 at John Muir Medical Center in Walnut Creek, California.

References

1914 births
1994 deaths
California Republican Party chairs
Judges of the California Courts of Appeal
Members of the California State Assembly
Politicians from Berkeley, California
University of California, Berkeley alumni
UC Berkeley School of Law alumni
20th-century American politicians
20th-century American judges